Punchi Banda Gunathilleke Kalugalla (19 March 1920 – 20 November 2007; commonly known as P. B. G. Kalugalla) was a Sri Lankan politician, Cabinet Minister and diplomat.
He contested the 1956 election as a Sri Lanka Freedom Party candidate for Kegalle electorate, won and was appointed as a Parliamentary Secretary to the Minister of Health by S. W. R. D. Bandaranaike. In June 1959 he was appointed as Minister of Cultural Affairs & Social Services, and held that portfolio under W. Dahanayake. Having held his seat in the 1960 parliamentary elections, he was appointed Minister of Transport & Works by Sirimavo Bandaranaike. In November 1962 he was appointed as Minister of Finance, then Minister of Education & Cultural Affairs in Bandaranaike's May 1963 cabinet reshuffle. Kalugalla held his seat through elections in 1965 and 1970, being appointed Minister of Shipping & Tourism, with Aviation being added to his portfolio following the Lanka Sama Samaja Party's departure from the Cabinet in 1975. The 1977 elections saw him lose the Kegalle seat, but won it back in 1994 on the Democratic United National Front ticket, being appointed Deputy Minister of Justice & Cultural Affairs by Chandrika Kumaratunge.

See also
Sri Lankan Non Career Diplomats

References

1920 births
2007 deaths
Sri Lankan Buddhists
Sinhalese lawyers
Finance ministers of Sri Lanka
Transport ministers of Sri Lanka
Members of the 3rd Parliament of Ceylon
Members of the 4th Parliament of Ceylon
Members of the 5th Parliament of Ceylon
Members of the 6th Parliament of Ceylon
Members of the 7th Parliament of Ceylon
Members of the 10th Parliament of Sri Lanka
Ambassadors of Sri Lanka to the Philippines
High Commissioners of Sri Lanka to Canada
Alumni of Maris Stella College
Parliamentary secretaries of Ceylon
Social affairs ministers of Sri Lanka
Culture ministers of Sri Lanka
Shipping ministers of Sri Lanka
Members of the Sabaragamuwa Provincial Council